Micah Stock (born December 31, 1988) is a Tony-nominated American actor best known for his roles in the Sundance breakout Brittany Runs a Marathon, as Doug in Netflix’s Bonding and as Kevin in the FX original series Kindred.

Early life 
Stock was born and grew up in Dayton, Ohio. He is a graduate of the Conservatory of Theater Arts and Film at the State University of New York at Purchase and was a classmate of Chris Perfetti

Career 
In 2021, Stock landed a starring role opposite Jon Hamm and Tina Fey in the John Slattery-directed independent feature Maggie Moore(s).

The National Geographic Channel announced in 2019  that Stock would appear as one of the original Mercury Seven astronauts, Donald K. "Deke" Slayton, in the Disney+ television series The Right Stuff.

He is known for his collaborations with playwright Terrence McNally including And Away We Go Off-Broadway and It's Only a Play on Broadway; the latter of which he was nominated for a Tony Award for Best Featured Actor in a Play. He received a 2015 Theatre World Award for an outstanding debut in a Broadway show.

Filmography

Film

Television

References

External links
 

State University of New York at Purchase alumni
American male stage actors
American male television actors
Male actors from Dayton, Ohio
Living people
21st-century American male actors
People from Oakwood, Montgomery County, Ohio
1988 births
Theatre World Award winners